"Des Dichters Abendgang" ("The Poets Evening Stroll") is an art song composed by Richard Strauss using the text of a poem with the same name by Ludwig Uhland (1787–1862), the second in his Opus 47 collection, (TrV 200) which was published in 1900. Originally written for piano and voice, Strauss wrote an orchestral version in 1918.

Composition history
Strauss wrote the song at his home in Charlottenburg near Berlin, completing it on May 8, 1900. Strauss set five of Uhlands's poems in his Opus 47 songs. He had only recently set another Uhland poem Die Ulme zu Hirsau (opus 43/3, 1899).  The poet had also been a childhood favourite of Strauss: two of his earliest Jugendlieder (childhood songs) written in 1871 were Uhland settings. Strauss' tempo marking is "Sehr ruhig and feierlich" (very quiet and solemn) and his setting "is a full scale heroic song, originally composed in Strauss' heroic key of E flat".  The song was published in a bilingual edition with English lyrics the same year. In 1918, he wrote an orchestral version of the song, this time in the key of D flat, which was premiered on April 20, 1919 in Berlin sung by tenor Ernst Kraus with Stauss conducting the Berlin Philharmonic.

Orchestral arrangement

The 1918 orchestral arrangement calls for the following instruments:

 Three flutes,  two oboes, English horn, two clarinets, Bass clarinet, two bassoons.
 Four french horns, three trumpets, three trombones, one tuba
 Timpani
 Two harps (playing in unison).
 Strings

Lyrics

The poem captures the enlightenment and transcendence felt by the poet as he takes his evening stroll.  The inner light guides him even when times become dark.

See also

References
Notes

Sources

 Del Mar, Norman (2009)[1968]. Richard Strauss: A Critical Commentary on his Life and Works, Volume 3 (second edition). London: Faber and Faber. .
 Jefferson, Alan (1971). The Lieder of Richard Straus. London: Cassel and Company. .
 Trenner, Franz (2003). Richard Strauss Chronik. Wien: Verlag Dr Richard Strauss Gmbh. .

Songs about writers
Songs by Richard Strauss
1900 songs
Adaptations of works by Ludwig Uhland